The Quesnel Kangaroos was an intermediate and senior ice hockey team in Quesnel, British Columbia that played as an Intermediate team at least as far back as 1965. In 1979, they became a member of the upstart BCSHL. After the demise of the BCSHL (after just two seasons), the Kangaroos continued on as either an independent Senior or Intermediate club.  In 1993 the team played in the Allan Cup final but lost to the Whitehorse Huskies in the final game.

Awards

Allan Cup (Canadian Senior Championship)
1993: Hosted
1993: Lost final

Hardy Cup (Canadian Intermediate Championship)
1979: Lost Finals
1982: Lost Finals
1988: Lost Finals

Edmonton Journal Trophy (Western Canada Intermediate Championship)
1979: Won
1982: Won
1988: Won

Coy Cup (British Columbia Intermediate Champions)
1966: Won
1968: Won
1979: Won
1982: Won
1988: Won

References

See also
Cariboo Hockey League

Ice hockey teams in British Columbia